Tellurium dichloride is a chloride of tellurium with the chemical formula TeCl2.

Preparation 
Tellurium dichloride can be produced by reacting tellurium with difluorodichloromethane.

It can also be produced by the comproportionation of tellurium and tellurium tetrachloride.

Properties
Tellurium dichloride is a black solid that reacts with water. It will melt into a black liquid and vapourize into a purple gas. The gas consists of monomeric TeCl2 molecules with Te–Cl bond lengths of 2.329 Å and a Cl–Te–Cl bond angle of 97.0°.

Reactions
Tellurium dichloride reacts with barium chloride in water to form barium tellurite.
BaCl2 + 2 TeCl2 + 3 H2O -> Te + BaTeO3*3H2O + 6 HCl

References

Tellurium(II) compounds
Chlorides
Gases with color